Bhoj  is a village in Belagavi district in the 
Southern state of Karnataka, India.

Bhoj is a large village surrounded by the Vedaganga River on two sides—south and west. There is a meeting of two rivers Vedaganga and Doodhaganga at north west and making Doodhaganga river her way from west to east.

Culture 
It is a good old story about Bhoj and her famous legendary Swamis goes like this. There was a Godman by name HH Mahant Swamiji. His era is not ascertainable. Maybe around 500 to 600 years back. His samadhi (memorial) is there in Bhoj. His contemporary HH Bangal Saab Maharaj was also lived in nearby village called Karadaga. Karadaga is hardly 2 km away. There is holy river in between. These two godmen would meet each other and exchange their views and respect for the Lords. During olden days especially during the rainy season it was not possible to cross the flooded Doodhaganga river. Karadaga Bangaal Saab used to cross the river by simply sitting on a mat floating across the flooded river. Thus the swamijis would meet each other daily.

Now Bhoj is a village known for the Jain Muni Shri 108 Pratham-Acharya Shantisagarji Maharaj.

The Village Is Also Well Known For its Folk Tale of a Godman Named Vrushabh Chougale ( Famously known as Elneer Pindkya) who supposedly lived around 1400 AD.

References 

Villages in Belagavi district